Crime d'honneur is the second album of Québécois rapper Manu Militari and was released on December 1, 2009. The album won the Félix Award in 2010.

Track listing

Personnel
 Manu Militari - primary artist
 Youssef Nait Bach - composer
 Hantz "Vice" Felix - composer
 J. "Lonik" Hovington - composer
 Cheb Nino - composer, guest artist

References

Manu Militari albums
2009 albums
Hip hop albums by Canadian artists